The International Avenue Border Crossing connects the towns of Calais, Maine and St. Stephen, New Brunswick via the International Avenue Bridge on the Canada–US border. The crossing opened on November 16, 2009, and was the first new border crossing to open on the Canada–US border in 42 years.  The opening of the crossing marked the first time since 1961 (when the Union Bridge was closed) that there have been three bridges connecting Calais with St. Stephen. Currently, all commercial vehicles crossing between these towns must use this crossing.

 List of Canada–United States border crossings

References

Canada–United States border crossings
2009 establishments in Maine
2009 establishments in New Brunswick
Buildings and structures in Calais, Maine
St. Stephen, New Brunswick